The list of ship launches in 1857 includes a chronological list of some ships launched in 1857.


References

Sources

1857
Ship launches